The Twentieth Century Club is a women's social club founded in the late 19th century in Buffalo, New York.  It is located at 595 Delaware Avenue, in the Delaware District neighborhood. It was the first club run by women, for women, in the United States.

The club developed out of the Graduates Association of the Buffalo Seminary, spearheaded by Charlotte Mulligan, a teacher, writer, and musician from a well-to-do family. She envisioned a club rich in tradition, education, and culture. The Twentieth Century Club became noted for the many lavish social events held there, but education was, and still is, the primary focus of activity. Starting with an 1894 lecture on Abraham Lincoln, and continuing through the present, the Club has a long tradition of presenting prominent speakers and programs by recognized experts on a wide variety of subjects. From the 19th century, when women couldn't vote and had limited opportunity, to today in the 21st century when possibilities seem limitless, the Twentieth Century Club has truly spanned its namesake century and connected those prior and succeeding. Its history parallels and chronicles not only the history of events in Buffalo, but also that of the enormous societal changes which have occurred in its lifespan.

In 1894, the club purchased the present property and hired the firm of Green & Wicks to design a clubhouse to add to the front of an existing Baptist church.  The clubhouse is a three-story building in the Italian renaissance style. The building is 78 feet wide and 96 feet deep. The first story is of Indiana limestone and the rest of the structure of pressed brick, of a warm red tone, with a cornice of terra cotta. The Ionic order pillars across the front of the second story are of blue marble.  The original church structure at the rear of the lot was demolished in 1904 and a gymnasium, pool, showers, and a hot room were added.  Additional land and a formal garden were added to the rear of the property in 1933.

In 2011 the building was listed on the National Register of Historic Places.

See also
National Register of Historic Places listings in Buffalo, New York

References

External links
 History of the Twentieth Century Club of Buffalo
 The Twentieth Century Club of Buffalo Collection on New York Heritage Digital Collections

Women's club buildings in New York (state)
Renaissance Revival architecture in New York (state)
Clubhouses on the National Register of Historic Places in New York (state)
Cultural infrastructure completed in 1894
Buildings and structures in Buffalo, New York
History of women in New York (state)
National Register of Historic Places in Buffalo, New York
Green & Wicks buildings